Banksia railway station is located on the Illawarra line, serving the Sydney suburb of Banksia. It is served by Sydney Trains T4 line services.

History
Banksia station opened on 21 October 1906 with one island platform. In 1923, as part of the quadruplication of the Illawarra line from Wolli Creek to Rockdale, Platforms 1 and 4 were built along with an underpass.

In August 2020, an upgrade to Banksia station as part of the Station Access Program was proposed. It includes the addition of lifts, heavily modified entrances, canopy extensions, and upgraded toilets. Construction began in December 2020 and was completed on 16 March 2022, and the lifts were opened on 7 April 2022.

Platforms & services

Transport links
Transit Systems operates one route via Banksia station:
420 Westfield Burwood to Mascot station via Sydney Airport

Banksia station is served by three NightRide routes:
N10: Sutherland station to Town Hall station
N11: Cronulla station to Town Hall station
N20: Riverwood station to Town Hall station

References

External links

Banksia station details Transport for New South Wales

Railway stations in Sydney
Railway stations in Australia opened in 1906
Illawarra railway line
Bayside Council
Easy Access railway stations in Sydney